Junior Marvin (born Donald Hanson Marvin Kerr Richards Jr., June 22, 1949), also known as Junior Marvin-Hanson, Junior Hanson, Junior Kerr, and Julian Junior Marvin is a Jamaican-born guitarist and singer best known for his association with Bob Marley and The Wailers. He started his career as Junior Hanson with the band Hanson in 1973. Marvin has also been associated with Gass, Keef Hartley Band, Toots & the Maytals and Steve Winwood.

Biography
Born in Kingston, Surrey County, Jamaica, Marvin moved to London as a child, where his love of both acting and music was nurtured. He appeared in the Beatles' film Help!, which was followed by a number of other television appearances.  Meanwhile, Marvin served his musical apprenticeship in America by playing with the likes of blues legend T-Bone Walker and Ike & Tina Turner.  Back in England he played with bands such as Herbie Goins & The Nighttimers, Blue Ace Unit and White Rabbit.

In 1973 Marvin formed the band Hanson and recorded two albums. 
Marvin met Bob Marley on 14 February 1977 and joined Bob Marley and The Wailers. 
After the death of Bob Marley in 1981, Marvin along with the remaining Wailers members formed The Wailers Band and released the albums ID, Majestic Warriors, JAH Message, and Live 95–97 My Friends.  In 1997, Marvin left The Wailers Band and relocated to Brazil, where he formed a short-lived group called Batuka. 
Following his departure from Brazil, Marvin worked as a session musician for Kaliroots and The Wailers Band.  In 2007, Marvin recorded a solo album titled Wailin' For Love.  In 2008, Marvin and guitarist Al Anderson formed The Original Wailers and toured with them until 2011.  After departing from The Original Wailers, Marvin returned to solo work.
Marvin left The Wailers Band in September 2018. In 2019, Junior formed The Legendary Wailers. His band performed on The 80s Cruise in 2020 under the stars in the Caribbean.

Associations

Bands
1965 – Blue-Ace-Unit with Calvin "Fuzzy" Samuel.
1969 – White Rabbit with Linda Lewis.
1970 – Keef Hartley Band as Junior Kerr.
1973 – Hanson as Junior Hanson.
1977 – Bob Marley & The Wailers as Junior Marvin
1981 – The Wailers Band
1997 – Batuka
2005 – The Wailers Band
2008 – The Original Wailers
2011 – Junior Marvin
2013 – Junior Marvin & One Love
2014 – Junior Marvin's Force One
2015 – Junior Marvin's Wailers
2018 – The Wailers
2019 – Julian Junior Marvin´s Wailers
2020 - The Legendary Wailers

Sessions

Gass Juju  Polydor (1970) credited as Junior Kerr
Toots & the Maytals Reggae Got Soul (1976)
Delroy Washington I Sus (1976)
Stomu Yamashta, Steve Winwood, Michael Shrieve Go (1976) credited as Julian Marvin
Steve Winwood Steve Winwood (1977) credited as Junior Hanson or Julian [Jr] Marvin
Burning Spear Hail H.I.M. (1980) and The Fittest of the Fittest (1983)
Joe Higgs Blackman Know Yourself (1990)
Bunny Wailer Hall of Fame: A Tribute to Bob Marley (1995)
Don Carlos Prophecy (1995)
Culture Payday (1999)
Israel Vibration Jericho  (2000)
Lenny Kravitz on Saturday Night Live, 20 January 2001
OAR "Any Time Now" and "Night Shift/Stir It Up," (2002)
Alpha Blondy Jah Victory (2007)
 Quique Neira (Chile), Jah Rock (2007)
Jah Roots Joy Ganjah Records (2008)
 Los Pericos "Pericos & Friends" (2010)
Regan Perry "Flow", Mash It Up Records (2013)

Wailers Band albums
 ID (1989)
 Majestic Warriors (1991)
 JAH Message (1995)
 My Friends (1997)

Solo albums
 Wailin' For Love (2007)
 Smokin' to the Big M Music (2013)
 Lion to Zion-Dub Wise (2013)

Video
 Red Bull Music Academy Lecture with Junior Marvin (Montreal 2016)
 Interview with Junior Marvin and Wayne Jobson (video)

References

Further reading
Moskowitz, David. Bob Marley. Greenwood Publishing Group (2007).

External links
 
  Original Wailers website
 
 Fiji Times article (Dec 2006)
 Miller, Mark (1999) Junior Marvin Out of the Shadow & Into the Light. New York Times Service.

Living people
1949 births
Jamaican reggae musicians
Jamaican guitarists
Male guitarists
Musicians from Kingston, Jamaica
The Wailers members